Neudeggergasse Synagogue (German: Synagoge Neudeggergasse) was a Jewish synagogue in Vienna, Austria.1 The synagogue served the Jewish community of the VII. and VIII. Districts (Neubau and Josefstadt).
It was commissioned by Baron Moritz von Königswarter, and the architect was Max Fleischer.

The synagogue was built in the North-German Neo-Gothic style. It was mostly constructed of brick, including the façade and the two towers. The main hall was divided by pillars into three naves; more than 300 people could sit on the ground level. As in many synagogues, the women sat separate from the men and could watch the proceedings from the balcony on the second floor. The synagogue apparently had excellent acoustics.

The synagogue was destroyed during the Reichskristallnacht pogroms in 1938, after the Anschluß of Austria to Nazi Germany. During the construction of new buildings for housing in 1998, parts of the previous façade were rebuilt in vinyl, but the owner of the house at Neudeggergasse 10 did not want a complete reconstruction.

See also 
 History of the Jews in Austria
 Leopoldstädter Tempel
 Synagogue in Pilsen

Notes
1 The synagogue was located at Neudeggergasse 10–12, in the VIII. district (Josefstadt).

References

Literature 

 Bob Martens, Herbert Peter: "The Destroyed Synagogues of Vienna – Virtual city walks". Vienna: LIT Verlag, 2011.

Synagogues in Vienna
Former synagogues in Austria
Synagogues destroyed during Kristallnacht (Austria)
Vienna Neudeggergasse Synagogue